Məmmədrzalı (also, Mamed-Rzali and Mamedrzaly) is a village and municipality in the Jalilabad Rayon of Azerbaijan.  It has a population of 1,491.

References 

Populated places in Jalilabad District (Azerbaijan)